Diloma Samoaense is a species of sea snail, a marine gastropod mollusk in the family Trochidae, the top snails. Diloma Samoaense got its name from the Samoan islands where it first originated

Description
The size of the shell varies between 8 mm and 11 mm.

Distribution
This marine species occurs off Tutuila, the largest and the main island of American Samoa in the archipelago of Samoan Islands.

References

External links
 

samoaense
Fauna of American Samoa
Tutuila
Gastropods described in 2003